Kirk Jellerson is a former American football player and coach.  He served as the interim head football coach at Utica College in 2007 and as the head football coach at Whittier College in 2011.

Playing career
After graduating from St. Paul High School in Santa Fe Springs, California, where he was a member of California state runner-up team in 1978, he went on to play football at Cerritos College and Weber State University.  He earned a bachelor's degree from California State University, Long Beach in 1988.

Coaching career
Jellerson began his coaching career at Cerritos College, where he was the linebackers coach from 1983 to 1988.  While at Cerritos, they won the South Coast Championship in 1986 and played in three bowl games.  He then moved on to Fullerton College, where he was an assistant from 1989 to 1992.  After one season as an assistant coach at Whittier College in 1993, he went to Chapman University, where he was an assistant from 1994 top 1996.  During his time at Chapman, the Panthers went 26–4–1.  Jellerson was the defensive coordinator at Plymouth State University in 1999 and at Kean University from 2000 to 2002.  From 2004 from 2006, Jellerson served as the assistant head coach at Utica College and then moved on to Western Washington University from in 2008.  In 2008, Western Washington won the Rotary Bowl championship before they ended the program.  In 2009 and 2010, Jellerson was the defensive coordinator at Whittier College.  On November 18, 2010, he was named the interim head coach at Whittier College. On February 21, 2011, he was named the head coach at Whittier College. He was removed of his head coaching duties right after the 2011 season.

Head coaching record

References

1960s births
Living people
Chapman Panthers football coaches
Kean Cougars football coaches
People from Santa Fe Springs, California
Plymouth State Panthers football coaches
Utica Pioneers football coaches
Weber State Wildcats football players
Western Washington Vikings football coaches
Whittier Poets football coaches
Junior college football coaches in the United States
Cerritos Falcons football players
California State University, Long Beach alumni
Sportspeople from Los Angeles County, California
Players of American football from California